William Grant Smith (January 11, 1893 – July 16, 1957) was a Canadian politician. He served in the Legislative Assembly of New Brunswick as member of the Progressive Conservative party from 1939 to 1948.

References

1893 births
1957 deaths
20th-century Canadian politicians
Progressive Conservative Party of New Brunswick MLAs
Politicians from Saint John, New Brunswick